The knockout stage of the 1997 FIFA Confederations Cup began on 19 December with the semi-final round, and concluded on 21 December 1997 with the final at the King Fahd II Stadium, Riyadh. The top two teams from each group advanced to the knockout stage to compete in a single-elimination style tournament. A third place match was included and played between the two losing teams of the semi-finals.

In the knockout stage (including the final), if a match was level at the end of 90 minutes, extra time of two periods (15 minutes each) would be played. If the score was still level after extra time, the match would be decided by a penalty shoot-out. Additionally, a golden goal rule was used, according to which if the goal is scored during the extra time, the game ends immediately and the scoring team becomes the winner.

Qualified teams

Bracket

Semi-finals

Brazil vs Czech Republic

Uruguay v Australia

Third-place match

Final

References

Knockout
Confederations Cup
Confederations Cup
Confederations Cup
Confederations Cup
December 1997 sports events in Asia